Arabella Station, is a historic building on Magazine Street in New Orleans, Louisiana.  It was added to the National Register of Historic Places on January 4, 1996.  It is now a Whole Foods for Uptown New Orleans.

It has also been known as Arabella Carbarn and as Upper Magazine Station/Carbarn.  It was a carbarn for storage and parking of streetcars.  It was designed by New Orleans city engineer Linus W. Brown.  It was built by the Youngstown Bridge Co.

The building now houses a Whole Foods Market, which opened in December 2002, and off-street parking for the market.

References

Commercial buildings on the National Register of Historic Places in Louisiana
Buildings and structures in New Orleans
Buildings and structures completed in 1893
National Register of Historic Places in New Orleans